Rafik Badalyan (born October 24, 1943 in Yerevan), is an Armenian sculptor, painter, physico-mathematician.

Biography
Rafik Badalyan was born on October 24, 1943 in Yerevan in a military family. He studied at secondary school after Stalin (nowadays-after Vahan Teryan). Rafik entered Yerevan State University in 1962. He studied in physico-mathematical department. During studies he went to serve in Soviet Army. Finishing his service Rafik Badalyan continued his education and graduated from university in 1968. He worked in Polymer Research Institute during Soviet Union. In 1970 he was recalled to serve in the army but this time as an officer. He was trained as an officer in Novosibirsk and Gomel. In 1973 he was demobilized and returned to his previous job. In 1976 he worked in the lab of integral and hybrid microcircuits and sensors in Abovyan. In 1978 he studied in Institute of Electronic Technology in Moscow where received his PhD in Physics. Ha wrote about 50 research papers, monographs and fixed copyright discoveries. His papers were published in Armenia, Russia, Germany, Hungary, Bulgaria.
Since 1995 he has been working at Nairit factory in Yerevan.

Art works 
During his childhood and following years he studied painting, and while he was at the university he studied sculpture. He also started to create micro miniatures in 1985–1986. Rafik Badalyan had many exhibitions in Armenia, Abkhazia, Russia, India, France, Arab Emirates. He has miniatures in United States, Australia, Sweden, Denmark, Russia, Spain, Ukraine. Now he lives and works in Yerevan. Besides creating micro miniatures he also carves on precious stones and wood.

Sources 
Armenian Soviet Encyclopedia
Rafik Badalyan's works

Armenian sculptors
1943 births
Scientists from Yerevan
Living people
Artists from Yerevan